The Independence March is an annual patriotic and nationalist demonstration in Warsaw held on Poland's Independence Day, November 11. Since 2011 the March has attracted annually up to 10 thousand participants. In  2020 the March was organized like a car procession. It is organized by far-right ultranationalist organisations and parties: National Radical Camp (ONR), All-Poland Youth and the National Movement.

Theme 

 2012 – Let's get Poland back,
 2013 – New generation is coming,
 2014 – Patriot Army,
 2015 – Poland for Poles, Poles for Poland,
 2016 – Poland as a stronghold of Europe,
 2017 – We want God!,
 2018 – Poland for You,
 2019 – Have in Your care the whole nation,
 2020 – Our civilization, our rules,
 2021 – Independence – not for sale,
 2022 – Strong Nation Great Poland.

References

External links 

Official page

Events in Warsaw
Demonstrations